Lithostygnus is a genus of beetles in the family Latridiidae, containing the following species:

 Lithostygnus cuneiceps Broun, 1914
 Lithostygnus serripennis Broun, 1914
 Lithostygnus sinuosus (Belon, 1884)

References

Latridiidae genera